This is a list of the main career statistics of professional tennis player Rafael Nadal. All statistics are according to the ATP Tour website. To date, Nadal has won 92 ATP singles titles, including a men's joint-record 22 Grand Slam singles titles and 36 ATP Tour Masters 1000 titles. He is one of two men to achieve the Career Golden Slam in men's singles, with titles at all four majors and the Olympic singles gold. He is the first man in history to win Grand Slam singles titles on three different surfaces in a calendar year (Surface Slam) and is the youngest (24) in the Open Era to achieve the Career Grand Slam. Following his triumph at the 2022 Australian Open, he became the fourth man in history to complete the double Career Grand Slam in singles, after Roy Emerson, Rod Laver, and Novak Djokovic. He is the first man to win multiple majors and rank world No. 1 in three different decades. Representing Spain, Nadal has won 2 Olympic gold medals including a singles gold at the 2008 Beijing Olympics and a doubles gold at the 2016 Rio Olympics. In the process, he became the first male player in history to complete the Career Grand Slam and win Olympic gold medals in both singles and doubles. Nadal is the only Spanish player, male or female, to win all four majors twice, to rank world No. 1 for more than 200 weeks, and to win more than 20 majors. He has led Spain to 4 Davis Cup titles in 2004, 2009, 2011, and 2019. At the international level, he has won the 2017 and 2019 editions of the Laver Cup with Team Europe.

Historic achievements
Nadal has been the most successful player in history on clay courts. He has a 63–8 record in clay court tournament finals and has lost only three times in best-of-five-set matches on clay. He has won 14 French Open titles (unbeaten in finals), 12 Barcelona Open titles (unbeaten in finals), 11 Monte-Carlo Masters titles, and 10 Rome Masters titles, and has won at least one of the three clay-court Masters 1000 tournaments every year between 2005 and 2014. His 9th French Open crown in 2014 made him the first man in the Open Era to win a single tournament 9 times, breaking a 32-year record held by Guillermo Vilas, who won the Buenos Aires title 8 times. He subsequently won his 9th title at three more tournaments; 2016 Monte Carlo, 2016 Barcelona, and the 2019 Italian Open. In 2018, he became the sole record-holder for most titles at the ATP 500 (Barcelona), Masters 1000 (Monte Carlo), and Grand Slam (French Open) levels.

He also holds the longest single-surface win streak in the Open Era, having won 81 consecutive matches on clay between April 2005 and May 2007. Nadal has never been taken to five sets in 14 French Open finals, and has never lost consecutive matches on clay since the start of his professional career. Many tennis critics and top players regard him as the greatest clay-court player of all time. Nadal's 14 French Open titles are a record for one player (male or female) at a single major, surpassing the old record of 11 Australian Open titles won by Margaret Court. Nadal is the only player to defeat Roger Federer in the finals of three different Grand Slam tournaments as well as on three different surfaces (2009 Australian Open on hard court, 2006 French Open on clay court, and 2008 Wimbledon on grass court). He has won 6 hard-court majors (2 Australian Open & 4 US Open titles), tied with Andre Agassi for fourth-most behind Pete Sampras (7), Federer (11) and Novak Djokovic (13) in the Open Era.

Nadal is the first player to win four Grand Slam titles without dropping a set (2008, 2010, 2017 and 2020 French Opens) surpassing the old record of three titles held by Björn Borg. He is also the first player, male or female, to win 100 matches at the French Open and holds the all-time record for the most match wins at a single major, with 112 at the French Open. He is the only player, male or female, to record three streaks of four or more consecutive titles at a single major in their career (2005–2008, 2010–2014 and 2017–2020 French Open), surpassing the old record of 3 consecutive Wimbledon titles won by Sampras twice (1993–1995, 1997–2000). Nadal is the only player to bagel both Federer (2008 French Open) and Djokovic (2020 French Open) and defeat both in straight sets in Grand Slam finals. He has won the most ATP titles (30 titles) without dropping a set, with 26 of these titles won on clay courts and 4 on hard courts. 

Nadal is the sixth player to be ranked ATP world No. 1 for more than 200 weeks. Nadal has qualified for the ATP Finals for a record 16 consecutive years (2005–2020).

Nadal is the third male player to win over US$100 million in prize money after Djokovic and Federer.

Nadal is the one of three male players in history to have won at least two Grand Slam titles each on grass (2), hard courts (6) and clay (14), alongside Mats Wilander and Djokovic.

Nadal won five straight French Open singles titles from 2010 to 2014 to become the only player in the tournament's history to win 5 consecutive singles titles, breaking the previous record of 4 titles held by Paul Aymé and Borg. In 2017, by winning his 10th French Open title, Nadal became the first man to win a milestone 10 titles at the same major. He has played 32 matches against his primary rivals — Federer and Djokovic — in majors and leads 21–11 (10–4 vs Federer and 11–7 vs Djokovic). He is 14–2 on clay and 7–9 off clay against them.

In 2018, Nadal became the first player, male or female, to amass 450+ match wins on both hard and clay courts, with 514 and 474 wins respectively. His 500+ hard court wins rank him No. 4 on the Open Era list, and his 1000+ total match wins have only been achieved by four other players in the Open Era. He holds the record for winning at least one Grand Slam title in 10 consecutive years (2005–14) breaking the previous record of 8 consecutive years held by Borg, Sampras and Federer. He also holds the record for most years (15) winning at least one Grand Slam title (2005–14, 2017–20, 2022).

In 2008, Nadal became the second Spanish man to win Wimbledon. Nadal is one of only two male players in history to have won the French Open and Wimbledon in the same year at least twice, after Rod Laver and Borg. In 2009, Nadal became the first Spaniard to win the Australian Open.

He is also the first of two male players to win three consecutive Grand Slam tournaments on three different surfaces (clay, grass, and hard courts) in the same year (2010), a feat later achieved by Djokovic (2021). By winning the 2010 US Open, Nadal completed a men's singles Career Grand Slam at the age of 24, making him the youngest in the Open Era to do so. He is the 7th male player in history to achieve this feat. In addition, Nadal has completed the Career Golden Slam and is only the second male player in history to attain this after Andre Agassi. By winning the 2022 Australian Open, he became the fourth man in history (joining Roy Emerson, Rod Laver, and Djokovic) to complete the Double Career Grand Slam, by winning each Grand Slam title at least two times. Nadal has won ATP tournaments in 19 countries throughout his career.

He is the only male player to win the French Open and the US Open in the same year four times (2010, 2013, 2017, 2019). Both Ivan Lendl (1986, 1987) and Laver (1962, 1969) achieved this feat twice.

Nadal has won 36 ATP Masters 1000 titles, two behind Djokovic, and reached 53 finals, a record 76 semi-finals, and a record 99 quarter-finals.

Because of these many accomplishments, Nadal is considered by many sports analysts to be the greatest tennis player of all time.

Performance timelines

Davis Cup, Laver Cup, ATP Cup, United Cup and World Team Cup matches are included in the statistics. Walkovers are neither official wins nor official losses.

Singles
Current after the 2023 Australian Open.

* Nadal withdrew before the third round of the 2016 French Open due to a wrist injury, and before the semi-finals of 2022 Wimbledon due to an abdominal tear which do not officially count as losses.
+ Did not participate in the 2008 Davis Cup Final.
1 Held as Hamburg Masters (clay) until 2008, Madrid Masters (clay) 2009–present.
2 Held as Stuttgart Masters (indoor hardcourt) in 2001, Madrid Masters (indoor hardcourt) from 2002 to 2008, Shanghai Masters (outdoor hardcourt) 2009–present.
3 Including appearances in Grand Slam and ATP World Tour main draw matches and in Summer Olympics.
4 Including matches in Grand Slam, in ATP Tour, in Summer Olympics, in Davis Cup, Laver Cup, ATP Cup and the United Cup.
5 Postponed to 2021 due to the coronavirus pandemic.

Doubles

1 Held as Hamburg Masters (clay) until 2008, Madrid Open (clay) 2009–present.
2 Held as Madrid Masters (indoor hardcourt) from 2002 to 2008, Shanghai Masters (outdoor hardcourt) 2009–present.

Grand Slam tournaments

Nadal's 22 Grand Slam singles titles place him tied 1st in the men's all-time rankings, along with Djokovic. His 30 Grand Slam singles finals place him 3rd in the men's all-time rankings, behind Djokovic's 33 and Federer's 31 finals, respectively. He has won 14 French Open titles, an all-time record at any tournament. He is the youngest player in the Open Era to win all four majors (24 years old).

Grand Slam tournament finals: 30 (22 titles, 8 runner-ups)

Year-end championship

Year–End Championship finals: 2 (2 runner-ups)

ATP Masters finals

Singles: 53 (36 titles, 17 runner-ups)
Nadal has won 36 Masters titles, two behind Novak Djokovic. He has had the longest run of consecutive years with at least one Masters title (10). He and Djokovic are the only players in history to win at least five Masters titles at four separate events (Monte Carlo – 11, Rome – 10, Madrid – 5, Canada – 5). He has reached the final of each tournament, including Hamburg, which is no longer a Masters.

Doubles: 3 (3 titles)

Olympic medal matches

Singles: 2 (1 Gold medal)

Doubles: 1 (1 Gold medal)

ATP career finals

Singles: 130 (92 titles, 38 runner-ups)

(*) signifies tournaments where Nadal won the title without dropping a set. He has won the most titles without dropping a set in the Open Era (30 titles).

(**) signifies tournaments where Nadal won the title after saving at least one match point. He is tied with Novak Djokovic and Thomas Muster for most titles won after saving at least one match point in the Open Era (7 titles).

Doubles: 15 (11 titles, 4 runner-ups)

(*) signifies tournaments where Nadal and his partner won the title without dropping a set.

(**) signifies tournaments where Nadal and his partner won the title after saving at least one match point.

Other professional tournaments

ATP Challengers & ITF Futures finals: 12 (8 titles, 4 runner-ups)

National Championships

Singles: 5 (4 titles, 1 runner-up)

Doubles: (1 title)

ATP world No. 1

 Note: The ATP Tour was suspended from 16 March to 21 August 2020. The ATP ranking was frozen from 23 March to 23 August 2020.

Weeks at No. 1 by span

Age at first and last dates No. 1 ranking was held

ATP world No. 1 ranking

No. 1 stats